The 2009–10 BBL season of the British Basketball League (BBL) was the 23rd season since the league's establishment in 1987. The regular season commenced on 25 September 2009, when Milton Keynes Lions claimed the first win of the season with a 94–81 victory in the opening game against Worcester Wolves.

A total of 13 teams took to the court including new start-up franchise Essex Pirates, which was founded by Great Britain Under 20s coach Tim Lewis, and a newly rebranded Rocks team carrying the name of the city of Glasgow instead of their previous Scottish Rocks title.

The League Championship came down to the final game of the season and was only claimed by Newcastle Eagles after Sheffield Sharks lost their last game, 97–95, to Worthing Thunder. Thunder's Evaldas Zabas' basket four seconds from the end meant that Newcastle had won the League even before taking to the court the following day.

Everton Tigers concluded the season with victory in the play-offs despite being the lowest seed in all of their Play-off encounters. An 80–72 win against Glasgow in the final gave Tigers their first ever Play-off title, only two years after its foundation in 2007.

Teams

Notable occurrences 
 Essex Pirates were the latest addition to the BBL, bringing the number of teams up to 13 in total for the season.
 Due to a sponsorship agreement with Glasgow City Council, the Scottish Rocks rebranded as the Glasgow Rocks to support its hometown.
 In early November the Worcester Wolves franchise was thrown into turmoil after a Coach Chuck Evans' team talk lead to a much publicised racism row resulting in his resignation and the discipling and sacking of six players following a team strike. In response to this the League agreed to postpone Wolves' following five games until later dates, plus in accordance with the league's rules, the franchise had been fined an undisclosed amount.
 Paul James marked his return to the League in December when he was appointed as Coach of the new-look Worcester Wolves, succeeding Chuck Evans.
 Following the scheduled demolition of the Bletchley Centre and delayed construction of their new venue, Milton Keynes Lions sought the use of an unusual facility as their home arena by renting floor space in thecentre:mk shopping mall. Middleton Hall played host to its first game on 12 January against Essex Pirates and would host a further nine games throughout the season.
 Milton Keynes Lions forward Guy Dupuy was crowned winner of the 2010 BBL Slam Dunk contest on 17 January, beating Kadiri Richard in the final round.
 Cheshire Jets guard John Simpson failed an Anti-doping drugs test it was announced on 29 March, testing positive for marijuana. The player subsequently had his contract terminated by the club with immediate effect.

BBL Championship (Tier 1)

Final standings

The play-offs

Quarter-finals

Semi-finals 1st leg

Semi-finals 2nd leg 

Everton Tigers win 190-158 on aggregate and Glasgow Rocks won 164-158 on aggregate.

Final

EBL National League Division 1 (Tier 2)

Final standings

EBL National League Division 2 (Tier 3)

Final standings

BBL Cup 
Due to the odd number of teams competing in the BBL Cup – 13 in total – the knockout tournament was structured with the Quarter-finals round featuring the winners of the five First round ties plus three teams given byes. The teams given bye's through the first round were the top-three placed teams from the 2008–09 season league campaign – Everton Tigers, Leicester Riders and Newcastle Eagles.

First round

Quarter-finals

Semi-finals 1st leg

Semi-finals 2nd leg 

Cheshire Jets won 167-159 on aggregate and Sheffield Sharks won 167-152 on aggregate.

Final

BBL Trophy 
For the 2009–10 season the Trophy saw a revamp in its format with the removal of the initial group stages in favour of a straight knockout tournament. All 13 members of the BBL were included plus three invitees from Division One of the English Basketball League, namely London Leopards, Manchester Magic and Reading Rockets.

First round

Quarter-finals

Semi-finals 1st leg

Semi-finals 2nd leg 

Newcastle Eagles won 185-176 on aggregate and Cheshire Jets won 181-148 on aggregate.

Final

All-Star Game

Statistics leaders

Monthly awards

Seasonal awards 

 Most Valuable Player: Mike Cook (Sheffield Sharks)
 Coach of the Year: Fabulous Flournoy (Newcastle Eagles)
 Team of the Year:
 Robert Yanders (Glasgow Rocks)
 Mike Cook (Sheffield Sharks)
 Charles Smith (Newcastle Eagles)
 Jason Johnson (Leicester Riders)
 Tafari Toney (Sheffield Sharks)
 Defensive Team of the Year:
 Reggie Jackson (Newcastle Eagles)
 Jessie Sapp (Glasgow Rocks)
 Fabulous Flournoy (Newcastle Eagles)
 Andrew Sullivan (Newcastle Eagles)
 Tafari Toney (Sheffield Sharks)
 British Team of the Year:
 Perry Lawson (Sheffield Sharks)
 James Jones (Everton Tigers)
 Olu Babalola (Everton Tigers)
 Andrew Sullivan (Newcastle Eagles)
 Tafari Toney (Sheffield Sharks)

References 

British Basketball League seasons
1
British